The Turkey River is a  tributary of the upper Mississippi River. Its main branch rises in Howard County, Iowa, near the city of Cresco. The other counties it or its tributaries cover are Chickasaw, Winneshiek, Fayette, Clayton, Delaware, and Dubuque. Tributaries include the Little Turkey River and Crane Creek.

Flowing from northwest to southeast, it flows through or near the cities of Spillville, Fort Atkinson, Eldorado (where it joins with the Little Turkey River), Clermont, Elgin, Elkader, Elkport, Garber, and Millville, before entering the Mississippi south of Guttenberg and across from Cassville, Wisconsin. At its mouth is the community of Turkey River, Iowa, which is named after the river. 

Recreational and wildlife areas
Cardinal Marsh Wildlife Management Area is a few miles southeast of Cresco. 
The mouth of the river is part of the Upper Mississippi River National Wildlife and Fish Refuge.

See also
List of rivers of Iowa

References

Iowa Department of Natural Resources
USDA

External links
TurkeyRiver.org

Rivers of Iowa
Tributaries of the Mississippi River
Rivers of Howard County, Iowa
Rivers of Chickasaw County, Iowa
Rivers of Winneshiek County, Iowa
Rivers of Fayette County, Iowa
Rivers of Clayton County, Iowa
Rivers of Delaware County, Iowa
Rivers of Dubuque County, Iowa